The LAX color tunnels were designed in the 1950s and installed in 1961 at the Los Angeles International Airport (LAX). Seven tunnels were created, three remain open to the public. The tunnels were envisioned by the architecture firm Pereira & Luckman, to minimize the experienced distance of the  tunnels. The work was overseen by Charles D. Kratka, the firm's head of interior design and they were designed by Janet Bennett, then a young artist on his team. The tiles were produced by Alfonso Pardinas of Byzantine Mosaics in San Francisco.

Tunnels 

As of September 2022, Tom Bradley International Terminal is connected to Terminal 4 via an above-ground passage, Terminal 4 to Terminal 5 to Terminal 6 are connected via an underground tunnel, and Terminal 6 to Terminal 7 to Terminal 8 are connected above ground.

Terminal 3 tunnel
Tunnel connecting Terminal 4 with Baggage Claim – moving sidewalk, Astrowalk
Tunnel connecting Terminal 4 with Terminal 5
Tunnel connecting Terminal 5 with Terminal 6
Tunnel connecting Terminal 6 rotunda with Baggage Claim – closed between 2001 and 2011

Legacy 

The hallways with their extensive tile-mosaic walls have appeared in a number of films and television programs, sometimes as symbolic funnels or liminal spaces. The tunnels appeared in memorable scenes in Jackie Brown, Airplane!, and Mad Men, among many others. In 2013, a Portland, Oregon company called The Athletic produced color-blocked tile-mosaic mural LAX Airport Socks.

References 

Los Angeles International Airport
Art in Greater Los Angeles